Bridgid Annisette-George is a Trinidad and Tobago lawyer and politician. She has been the Speaker of House of Representatives of Trinidad and Tobago since 2015, the second female to hold the position and currently the world's second longest female incumbent to consecutively hold the office of Speaker. She previously served as a Senator and the third female Attorney General of Trinidad and Tobago for the PNM before resigning to return to her private law practice.

Biography
Annisette was born in Trinidad and attended St. Joseph's Convent, Port of Spain in Port of Spain and went on to study law at the University of the West Indies. She graduated with a  Bachelors of Law in 1981. Annisette married Newman George, an engineer.

George became an associate tutor and lecturer at the Hugh Wooding Law School and the sole practicing attorney at the firm of Messrs. G.R. Annisette & Co. Between 1999 and 2003, George served as chair of the Diego Martin Regional Corporation and in 2003, served as a Commissioner on the Trinidad and Tobago Securities and Exchange Commission. In 2007, she was appointed as a Senator and 8 November 2007 became Attorney General, third woman of Trinidad and Tobago to hold the position. After serving eighteen months in the position, George resigned due to a conflict of interest in an ongoing investigation concerning the Colonial Life Insurance Company, as she had family members who were associated with the company. She was commended for her voluntary disclosure by colleagues and it was noted that there was no implication of involvement by George or her family members in the matter involving Colonial Life. She returned to her private practice.

In 2015, the People's National Movement won the majority in the elections and George was tapped to run for Speaker of the House. She was subsequently elected to the post.

References

External links
 Parliamentary Profile: Trinidad and Tobago Parliament website

1958 births
Living people
People from Port of Spain
University of the West Indies alumni
People's National Movement politicians
Members of the Senate (Trinidad and Tobago)
Members of the House of Representatives (Trinidad and Tobago)
Women government ministers of Trinidad and Tobago
Government ministers of Trinidad and Tobago
Women legislative speakers
Trinidad and Tobago women lawyers
21st-century Trinidad and Tobago women politicians
21st-century Trinidad and Tobago politicians
20th-century Trinidad and Tobago lawyers